Bjørn "Bummen" Johansen (born 7 September 1969) is a former Norwegian footballer, who played as a midfielder for Tromsø IL for most of his career. He is currently manager of Fredrikstad FK.

Club career
Johansen got his debut in 1987, and played for Tromsø until 1992. He moved to Viking in 1993, and stayed there for two seasons. In 1995, Johansen was back at Tromsø, and stayed with the club until 1999, and won the Norwegian Cup with Tromsø in 1996.

Johansen played for the Swedish team Helsingborgs IF between 2000 and 2001, and played for the club in the Champions League, before he again returned to Tromsø, when the club played in the First Division in 2002. and helped the club return to the Norwegian Premier League.

Johansen played for Tromsø between 1989 and 2005, with the exception of his 4 seasons and with his 326 league-games for Tromsø he is the player with the most matches for the club. Johansen also participated in four of Tromsø campaigns in European Cups.

International career
Johansen played international matches for various Norwegian youth international teams, and played for the under-20 team in the 1989 FIFA World Youth Championship. Johansen played 15 matches for Norway U21, but he was never capped for the senior team.

Coaching career
On 19 November 2010, the Third Division side Finnsnes announced that they had hired as head coach from the 2011-season onwards. The club won promotion to the Second Division in Johansen's first season as head coach.

Personal life
Johansen got his nickname Bummen by his brother when he was a child.

After Johansen's retirement in 2005, he has worked as a sports commentator for the Norwegian TV 2.

References

1969 births
Living people
Sportspeople from Tromsø
Norwegian footballers
Norway youth international footballers
Norway under-21 international footballers
Tromsø IL players
Viking FK players
Helsingborgs IF players
Eliteserien players
Allsvenskan players
Norwegian First Division players
Norwegian expatriate footballers
Expatriate footballers in Sweden
Norwegian expatriate sportspeople in Sweden
Norwegian football managers
Association football midfielders
Fredrikstad FK managers